Jkvr. Amoëne van Haersolte (born Ernestine Amoene Sophia van Holthe tot Echten; 23 February 1890 – 11 August 1952) was a Dutch writer of prose.

Van Haersolte was born in Utrecht. She won the first P. C. Hooft Award in 1947. She died, aged 62, in Dalfsen.

Bibliography

Novels 
 1949 - De komeet en het harlekijntje
 1951 - Lucile 
 1953 - De roerkop

Novellas 
 1927 - De laatsten 
 1946 - Sophia in de Koestraat 
 1953 - De roerkop

References 

1890 births
1952 deaths
Jonkvrouws of the Netherlands
P. C. Hooft Award winners
Writers from Utrecht (city)